The VS-40 (Foguete Suborbital VS-40) is a Brazilian sounding rocket using solid fuel, stabilized aerodynamically, distributed between the first stage S40TM (4,200 kg) engine and the second stage S44M (810 kg) engine.
This configuration corresponds to the upper stages of the VLS-1 rocket.

Flights
 VS-40 PT-01 - "Operação Santa Maria" - 1993/04/02 - Qualifying flight for the S44 engine. 760 seconds in micro-gravity.
 VS-40 PT-02 - "Operação Livramento" - 1998/03/21 - VAP-1 (Fokker) payload.
 VS-40M / SHEFEX II - 2012/06/22 - SHEFEX (Sharp Edge Flight Experiment) II payload.
 VS-40M / V03 - "Operação São Lourenço" - 2015/11/13 - SARA - Satélite de Reentrada Atmosférica (Atmospheric Reentry Satellite) Suborbital 1   - Failure (exploded on pad)
 VS-40M  - in development -  HIFiRE 8
 VS-40M  - Canceled - SARA Suborbital 2

Characteristics

Length (mm) 6725
Payload Mass (kg) 500
Diameter (mm) 1000
Total takeoff mass (kg) 6,737
Mass of propellant (kg) 5,054
Structural mass (kg) 1,028
Apogee (km) 650
Microgravity time (s) 760

References

External links

 O Foguete de sondagem VS-40
 Agência Espacial Brasileira :: Veículos Lançadores
 SHEFEX 2 at Andoya Rocket Range

Sounding rockets of Brazil
Space program of Brazil